Nacoleia ustulalis is a moth in the family Crambidae. It was described by George Hampson in 1903. It is found in India's Nilgiri Mountains.

References

Moths described in 1903
Nacoleia
Moths of Asia